Vineyard railway station is located on the Richmond line, serving the Sydney suburb of Vineyard. It is served by Sydney Trains T1 Western and T5 Cumberland line services.

History
The original Vineyard station opened on 14 July 1935.  The station was rebuilt in 1991 as part of the electrification of the line from Riverstone to Richmond.

There is no ticket machine and paper tickets are no longer sold or accepted as of August 2016, so passengers must have an Opal card.

Platforms & services
Historically, Vineyard has been served by services operating from Sydney CBD/North Shore, branching off the Western Line at Blacktown (under the service title of T1 Richmond). However, after a major timetable change for the Sydney Trains network on 26 November 2017, Cumberland line services started continuing out to Richmond, rather than terminating at Schofields, during the late night, taking over from the Richmond line at these times.

Transport links
Vineyard station is served by one NightRide route:
N71: Richmond station to Town Hall station

References

External links

Vineyard station details Transport for New South Wales

Railway stations in Sydney
Railway stations in Australia opened in 1935
Richmond railway line